Claude Auguste Thomassin (1865–1942) was a French bow maker, or .

Son of Louis Thomassin with whom he learned his craft in Mirecourt. In his early career, he worked for the shop of Gand & Bernadel. Many bows from this period are stamped "Gand & Bernadel".  In 1901 the family firm of Gand & Bernadel was taken over by Caressa & Français.  It was at this point that Claude Thomassin set up his own atelier at Rue de Paris in Paris.  Although he continued to produce some bows for his former employers, much of his output from 1901 onwards was branded with his name "Claude Thomassin" or sometimes "C.Thomassin à Paris".

Thomassin has been called one of the best makers of his generation.

"C. Thomassin's work is highly prized and respected for playability and beautiful workmanship" – Filimonov Fine Violins

References 

 
 
 
 Les Luthiers Parisiens aux XIX et XX siecles, vol. 3, "Jean-Baptiste Vuillaume et sa famille", Sylvette Milliot 2006
 
 

1865 births
1942 deaths
Place of birth missing
Place of death missing
Bow makers
19th-century French people
Luthiers from Mirecourt